Richard Joseph Edwin Douglas (born 6 February 1987) is a former Australian rules football player who played for the Adelaide Football Club in the Australian Football League (AFL). He was drafted by Adelaide with pick 16 in the 2005 national draft.

AFL career
He played two further games for the season, including a Qualifying Final. Douglas established himself in the side over the next two years, playing 13 games in 2007 and 22 of a possible 23 games in 2008.

On the night before the match, the test for swine flu came back negative; however, he did not play in the match. He returned to play the next match, although he was dropped from the side a few weeks later against . He played 18 games in 2009 in total.

In 2010, Douglas was given more responsibility in an injury-hit Adelaide side. He relished the opportunity, winning the 2010 Malcolm Blight Medal (club best and fairest award) and the Coaches' Award in a standout year in which he played all 22 matches and also signed a new contract with the club.

After struggling to find consistency due to injuries in 2011 and early 2012, Douglas began to recapture his 2010 form towards the end of 2012. He signed a new three-year contract with Adelaide in June 2012, and played his 100th AFL match shortly after, in round 12 against . Douglas had one of his best years at the club in 2013, finishing runner-up in the Malcolm Blight Medal and being named in the preliminary All-Australian squad. He ranked third in the competition for inside 50s, eighth for goal assists, and was second at the club for disposals, marks and tackles.

Douglas suffered a potentially serious groin injury in a trial game in the 2014 pre-season, but he surprisingly returned just three weeks later, wearing a cricket box in a match against  and collecting 29 disposals. He missed another two matches early in the season due to suspension after concussing  captain Callan Ward with a head-high bump, but he played every match for the remainder of 2014, averaging 22 disposals and starring in his 150th match against  in round 18. Douglas had his 2015 season interrupted by a foot injury and then appendicitis, but performed strongly when fit. In June he signed a new three-year deal with Adelaide, joining teammate Rory Sloane in committing to the club until the end of 2018, and declaring himself as "a Crow for life".

Statistics
 Statistics are correct to end of round 12, 2016

|- style="background:#eaeaea;"
! scope="row" style="text-align:center" | 2006
| style="text-align:center" | 
| 26 || 3 || 1 || 1 || 15 || 18 || 33 || 6 || 7 || 0.3 || 0.3 || 5.0 || 6.0 || 11.0 || 2.0 || 2.3
|-
! scope="row" style="text-align:center" | 2007
| style="text-align:center" | 
| 26 || 13 || 4 || 2 || 72 || 68 || 140 || 28 || 36 || 0.3 || 0.2 || 5.5 || 5.2 || 10.8 || 2.2 || 2.8
|- style="background:#eaeaea;"
! scope="row" style="text-align:center" | 2008
| style="text-align:center" | 
| 26 || 22 || 22 || 14 || 146 || 127 || 273 || 78 || 72 || 1.0 || 0.6 || 6.6 || 5.8 || 12.4 || 3.6 || 3.3
|-
! scope="row" style="text-align:center" | 2009
| style="text-align:center" | 
| 26 || 18 || 11 || 12 || 133 || 140 || 273 || 74 || 64 || 0.6 || 0.7 || 7.4 || 7.8 || 15.2 || 4.1 || 3.6
|- style="background:#eaeaea;"
! scope="row" style="text-align:center" | 2010
| style="text-align:center" | 
| 26 || 22 || 17 || 20 || 275 || 195 || 470 || 107 || 76 || 0.8 || 0.9 || 12.5 || 8.9 || 21.4 || 4.9 || 3.5
|-
! scope="row" style="text-align:center" | 2011
| style="text-align:center" | 
| 26 || 17 || 10 || 9 || 221 || 91 || 312 || 63 || 56 || 0.6 || 0.5 || 13.0 || 5.4 || 18.4 || 3.7 || 3.3
|- style="background:#eaeaea;"
! scope="row" style="text-align:center" | 2012
| style="text-align:center" | 
| 26 || 19 || 11 || 16 || 236 || 96 || 332 || 74 || 52 || 0.6 || 0.8 || 12.4 || 5.1 || 17.5 || 3.9 || 2.7
|-
! scope="row" style="text-align:center" | 2013
| style="text-align:center" | 
| 26 || 22 || 20 || 17 || 326 || 175 || 501 || 116 || 86 || 0.9 || 0.8 || 14.8 || 8.0 || 22.8 || 5.3 || 3.9
|- style="background:#eaeaea;"
! scope="row" style="text-align:center" | 2014
| style="text-align:center" | 
| 26 || 19 || 11 || 8 || 266 || 147 || 413 || 52 || 91 || 0.6 || 0.4 || 14.0 || 7.7 || 21.7 || 2.7 || 4.8
|-
! scope="row" style="text-align:center" | 2015
| style="text-align:center" | 
| 26 || 16 || 7 || 4 || 204 || 135 || 339 || 47 || 65 || 0.4 || 0.3 || 12.8 || 8.4 || 21.2 || 2.9 || 4.1
|- style="background:#eaeaea;"
! scope="row" style="text-align:center" | 2016
| style="text-align:center" | 
| 26 || 12 || 8 || 9 || 117 || 89 || 206 || 31 || 53 || 0.7 || 0.8 || 9.8 || 7.4 || 17.2 || 2.6 || 4.4
|- class="sortbottom"
! colspan=3| Career
! 183
! 122
! 112
! 2011
! 1281
! 3292
! 676
! 658
! 0.7
! 0.6
! 11.0
! 7.0
! 18.0
! 3.7
! 3.6
|}

References

External links

1987 births
Living people
Adelaide Football Club players
Glenelg Football Club players
Australian rules footballers from Melbourne
Calder Cannons players
Malcolm Blight Medal winners
Adelaide Football Club (SANFL) players
Australia international rules football team players